Gabriele Minì (born 20 March 2005) is an Italian racing driver who is currently competing in the 2023 FIA Formula 3 Championship with Hitech Grand Prix. He is the 2020 Italian F4 Champion, and was runner-up during the 2022 Formula Regional European Championship. He is a member of the Alpine Academy.

Career

Karting 
Minì started his karting career in 2012. His first karting title came in the Italian Championship in 2017 in the 60 Mini Class at the age of 12. The year after Minì mainly competed in international competitions, becoming champion in the WSK Super Master Series, beating Mercedes Academy driver Paul Aron among others, and finishing as runner-up in the CIK-FIA Karting World Championship. Following these achievements, Minì was signed to Nicolas Todt's All Road Management scheme. 2019 would be Minì's final year in karting; he finished second in the WSK Champions Cup and the FIA Karting European Championship respectively.

Lower formulae 

In late January 2020 it was announced that the Italian would make his car racing debut in the Italian F4 Championship and race in two rounds of the ADAC F4 Championship for Prema Powerteam alongside Sebastian Montoya, Gabriel Bortoleto and FDA-Member Dino Beganovic. Minì started his season off strongly by scoring all three pole positions at the first round in Misano, winning his first ever race in single-seaters. He would not score any more podiums for five consecutive races, although he finished each one of those races in the points. The Italian collected a hattrick of podiums at the Red Bull Ring, where he also won the third race of the weekend. After further wins in Mugello and Imola Minì had amassed a sizeable gap to his title rivals behind, and after a second-place finish in race two in the penultimate weekend the Italian was crowned champion of the series.

Minì also raced in two rounds of the ADAC F4 Championship, winning his first race in that series at the Nürburgring. He finished tenth in the standings.

Formula Regional

2021 

In December 2020 Minì took part in the post-season rookie test for the Formula Regional European Championship for ART Grand Prix alongside his F4 title rival Francesco Pizzi and Grégoire Saucy. Without prior experience in a car at that level Minì completed the second-fastest laptime of the day. After a second test later that month, the French outfit confirmed Minì would race with them in the 2021 season. He started his season off by scoring his first points in race 2 of the first round, with a sixth place also giving him the distinction of being the highest-placed rookie. In the second weekend in Barcelona Minì achieved his first podium in the category in the first race, while he went on to score more points in the second race. After two tenth-placed finishes at the Monaco Circuit the Italian returned to the podium in the first race at Paul Ricard. Following that Minì had his best weekend of the season at the Circuit Zandvoort, where he finished second and third, whilst also being the best rookie of the event. Minì finished the season seventh overall and second behind Isack Hadjar in the rookie standings.

2022 

Minì remained with ART Grand Prix for the 2022 Formula Regional European Championship.

2023 
Minì joined Hitech Grand Prix for the 2023 Formula Regional Middle East Championship during the opening three rounds, to prepare for his main Formula 3 campaign.

FIA Formula 3 
In September 2022, Minì took part in the FIA Formula 3 post-season test at Jerez, driving for Hitech Grand Prix, setting the fastest lap during the first day. That November, Minì announced that he would drive for the British team during the 2023 FIA Formula 3 Championship.

Formula One 
At the start of 2023, Miní was announced to be joining the Alpine Academy.

Karting record

Karting career summary

Complete CIK-FIA Karting European Championship results 
(key) (Races in bold indicate pole position) (Races in italics indicate fastest lap)

Racing record

Racing career summary 

* Season still in progress.

Complete Italian F4 Championship results 
(key) (Races in bold indicate pole position) (Races in italics indicate fastest lap)

Complete Formula Regional European Championship results 
(key) (Races in bold indicate pole position) (Races in italics indicate fastest lap)

Complete Formula Regional Asian Championship results 
(key) (Races in bold indicate pole position) (Races in italics indicate the fastest lap of top ten finishers)

Complete Formula Regional Middle East Championship results
(key) (Races in bold indicate pole position) (Races in italics indicate fastest lap)

Complete FIA Formula 3 Championship results 
(key) (Races in bold indicate pole position) (Races in italics indicate fastest lap)

* Season still in progress.

References

External links 
 

2005 births
Living people
Sportspeople from Palermo
Italian racing drivers
Italian F4 Championship drivers
Italian F4 champions
ADAC Formula 4 drivers
Formula Regional Asian Championship drivers
Formula Regional European Championship drivers
Prema Powerteam drivers
ART Grand Prix drivers
Hitech Grand Prix drivers
Karting World Championship drivers
FIA Formula 3 Championship drivers
Formula Regional Middle East Championship drivers